Stanley Henig (born 7 July 1939) is a British academic and former Labour Party politician.  He was Deputy Pro-Chancellor of Lancaster University from 2006 until 2011.

Early life
Stanley Henig was born on 7 July 1939 in Leicester, the son of the politician and businessman Sir Mark Henig, Lord Mayor of Leicester and the first chairman of the English Tourist Board. He was educated at Wyggeston Grammar School for Boys and Corpus Christi College, Oxford.

Career
An academic political scientist, he was one of the founders of the Department of Politics at Lancaster University in 1964. He later taught at the University of Warwick, the Civil Service College, and at the University of Central Lancashire where he was head of the Department of Politics and European Studies.

At the 1966 general election, Henig was returned to the House of Commons as Member of Parliament for Lancaster.  However, he lost his seat at the 1970 general election to the Conservative Party candidate, Elaine Kellett-Bowman, and did not stand again. He entered local politics, and in the 1990s he was leader of Lancaster City Council.

He was leader of the council at the time of the Blobbygate scandal and subsequently was deseated by the Greens at the 1999 council elections, although a later report by the district auditor cleared councillors of maladministration.

Personal life
His former wife Ruth Henig, is a retired historian and was also a long-serving member of Lancashire County Council. She stood unsuccessfully as Labour candidate for Lancaster at the 1992 general election and became a life peer in 2004.

They married in 1966, but divorced in 1993, having had two sons, one of whom is the psephologist Simon Henig. In 2008, Simon followed in his father's footsteps by becoming Leader of the Labour-controlled Durham County Council, a role he held until 2021.

References

External links 

1939 births
Academics of Lancaster University
Academics of the University of Warwick
Academics of the University of Central Lancashire
Alumni of Corpus Christi College, Oxford
British political scientists
Labour Party (UK) MPs for English constituencies
Living people
People educated at Wyggeston Grammar School for Boys
Politicians from Leicester
UK MPs 1966–1970
Jewish British politicians
20th-century English politicians
Spouses of life peers